Marine Wing Support Squadron 372 (MWSS 372) is an aviation ground support unit of the United States Marine Corps. Known as the "Diamondbacks", they are based out of Marine Corps Base Camp Pendleton, California. The squadron falls under the command of Marine Air Control Group 38, 3rd Marine Aircraft Wing and maintains a direct support relationship to Marine Aircraft Group 39, 3rd MAW.

Mission
MWSS-372 task organizes to conduct direct aviation ground support for Marine Aircraft Group 39 or other designated aviation forces. This is accomplished through establishing and supporting expeditionary aviation shore-based sites through forward aviation combat engineering, flight line operations, forward arming and refueling points, airfield damage repair, and aircraft salvage and recovery in order to enable expeditionary aviation operations.

History
On 2 June 1986 aboard Camp Pendleton, California, Marine Wing Support Squadron (MWSS) 372 was activated with 2 officers and 97 enlisted Marines and assumed the responsibility of providing Aviation Ground Support (AGS) to Marine Aircraft Group (MAG) 39.  The Squadron was formerly Detachment “A”, Marine Wing Support Group (MWSG) 37, and was formed on 1 July 1977. 

In 1990, the Squadron was called upon to deploy to Southwest Asia during Operation Desert Shield / Desert Storm.  Over 300 MWSS-372 Marines deployed as part of the military buildup in Saudi Arabia and the subsequent combat operations throughout Kuwait and Iraq.

Not long after the Squadron’s return, MWSS-372 was yet again called to action in an austere corner of the world.  Designated as the primary source of AGS to MAG-16, MWSS-372 deployed to Somalia in December of 1992 in support of Operation Restore Hope.  After conducting support operations out of the capital of Mogadishu, the Squadron pushed inland and established an initial AGS capability in the city of Balidogle until consolidating back in Mogadishu when the Marine mission subsided.

In January 1993, MCAS Camp Pendleton was devastated by the flooding of the Margarita River, completely shutting down aviation operations and destroying millions of dollars of equipment.  MWSS-372(-), despite having most of the Unit’s personnel and equipment in Somalia, spearheaded the recovery with communications, heavy equipment, and construction support.  The Unit was awarded the Navy Unit Commendation in recognition for these efforts.

In December 1996, the Squadron completed construction of the first K-Span structure build aboard Camp Pendleton, providing Marine Aviation Logistics Squadron 39 with a cost efficient means to accommodate the growing maintenance demands of the next millennium.

In early 2003, MWSS-372 would again find itself supporting operations in the Middle East.  In January, the Squadron deployed to Kuwait and augmented the offload preparation party with the reception of Maritime Prepositioned Equipment and Supplies (MPE/S) at the port of Shuiaba.

In March of 2003, it was determined that MWSS-372 would take part in the historic “March to Baghdad” at the outset of Operation Iraqi Freedom (OIF).  While supporting Marine aviation elements through strategic Forward Arming and Refueling Points (FARPs), the Squadron also dispensed fuel to army medevac aircraft as well as Marine tanks and assault amphibious vehicles during the push north to the Iraqi capital.

In November 2005, the Squadron was again forward deployed to Iraq in support of OIF.  In addition to providing AGS to 2d Marine Aircraft Wing (Forward), the “Diamondbacks” participated in combat operations with the 2d Marine Division during two historic Iraqi elections during OIF 04-06.2.

In recognition of MWSS-372’s outstanding performance in CONUS and Iraq throughout 2005, the Squadron formally received two major awards.  The Engineer Operations Company was named Engineer Company of the Year by the Marine Corps Engineer Association (MCEA) and the Squadron received the Hatch Award (MWSS of the Year) from the Marine Corps Aviation Association (MCAA).

From August 2007 to March 2008, the Unit was called to support Multi-National Force–West (MNF-W) at sites across Iraq, to include:  Al Asad Airbase, Al Qa’im, Mudaysis, and Fallujah. 

In September 2009, the Diamondbacks deployed in full to Southern Afghanistan to support Operation Enduring Freedom (OEF) 9.2.  The deployment culminated with MWSS-372 Marines providing FARP support to aircraft inserting Marines into the Taliban stronghold of Marjeh during Operation Moshtarak, the largest military operation in the Afghan War. 

In April of 2012, MWSS-372 transferred parent commands from MWSG-39 to MAG-39.  This realignment strengthened the relationship between the MWSS and supported flying squadrons and allowed for more flexible and timely AGS to MAG-39.

From September 2013 to April 2014, MWSS-372 deployed to Afghanistan in support of OEF 13.2 and assumed responsibility for providing AGS to units within ISAF Regional Command Southwest.  For the Squadron’s exceptional performance during 2013, it was again recognized as the MWSS of the Year by the MCAA.

Throughout its 36 year history, the MWSS-372 colors have been planted in all corners of the globe in support of Marine aviation.  Distinguishing themselves overseas as well as at home, the Squadron has cemented its legacy as the Corps’ premier MWSS.  This standard of excellence has endured for almost three decades and serves as the driving force for every Marine fortunate enough to claim the title, “Diamondback”.

Awards
Since its inception, Marine Wing Support Squadron 372 has received one Presidential Unit Citation, two Meritorious Unit Commendations, one Navy Unit Commendation, and the Armed Forces Expeditionary Medal.

  Presidential Unit Citation Streamer
  Navy Unit Commendation Streamer
  Meritorious Unit Commendation Streamer with two Bronze Star
  Armed Forces Expeditionary Streamer

See also
 United States Marine Corps Aviation
 Organization of the United States Marine Corps
 List of United States Marine Corps aviation support units

References

External links
 

 

MWSS372